Sharps Creek may refer to:

Sharps Creek (Kansas), a stream in McPherson and Rice counties
Sharps Creek (Oregon), a stream in Lane County

See also
Sharpe Creek, a creek in Georgia sometimes known as "Sharps Creek"